Willem Claesz Vooght (1572–1630), was a mayor of Haarlem best known today for the portrait painted of him by the painter Frans Hals.

Biography
He was the son of Claes Aelbertsz Vooght and the brother of Maritge Claesdr Voogt (1577–1644) who married the brewer Pieter Jacobsz Olycan, and Cornelia who married the brewer Nicolaes Woutersz van der Meer. He was himself the brewer at the family Vooght brewery.

Frans Hals painted him at the head of the table in his The Banquet of the Officers of the St Adrian Militia Company in 1627. His descendant, the art historian  Roeland van Eynden, made a copy of this portrait in 1786 with a memorial plaque in the background that stated that he was mayor and colonel of the Haarlem schutterij, died in 1630, and the portrait was copied from the famous schutterstuk by Frans Hals in the Doelen, Haarlem.

References

 De Haarlemse Schuttersstukken, by Jhr. Mr. C.C. van Valkenburg, pp. 47–76, Haerlem : jaarboek 1961, 
Portrait of  Willem Claesz Vooght by Roeland van Eynden on Christie's website

1572 births
1630 deaths
Mayors of Haarlem
Frans Hals